Empire Conyngham was a  cargo ship that was built as Marie  in 1899 by Neptun AG, Rostock, Germany for German owners. A sale in 1923 saw her renamed Norburg. She was sold to Latvia in 1925 and renamed Gauja, serving until 1941 when she was captured by the Kriegsmarine in the Baltic Sea. In 1945, she was seized by the Allies, passed to the Ministry of War Transport (MoWT) and was renamed Empire Conyngham. In 1946, she was scuttled with a cargo of obsolete bombs.

Description
The ship was built in 1899 by Neptun AG, Rostock.

The engine was built by Neptun AG.

History
Marie was built for the Flensburger Dampfschiff Gesellschaft, Flensburg. She was operated under the management of H Schuldt. In 1923, she was sold to Ozean Dampschiff AG and was renamed Norburg. In 1925, she was sold to the Latvian Government and was renamed Gauja. Her port of registry was Riga and the Code Letters TBDP were allocated. Gauja was operated under the management of Valsts Kuģu Pārvalde.

On 8 June 1941, Gauja was captured by the Kriegsmarine in the Baltic Sea. She was renamed Friedrich and operated by Otto Wiggers, Rostock. Friedrich was captured by the Allies in May 1945. She was passed to the MoWT and renamed Empire Conyngham. Her port of registry was changed to London and the Code Letters GKWN were allocated. On 18 June 1949, Empire Conyngham departed Dartmouth, Devon with a cargo of obsolete bombs. On 20 June, she was scuttled in the Bay of Biscay.

References

1899 ships
Captured ships
Empire ships
Maritime incidents in June 1941
Maritime incidents in 1949
Merchant ships of Latvia
Merchant ships of Germany
Merchant ships of the United Kingdom
Ministry of War Transport ships
Scuttled vessels of the United Kingdom
Ships built in Rostock
Shipwrecks in the Bay of Biscay
Steamships of Latvia
Steamships of Germany
Steamships of the United Kingdom
World War I merchant ships of Germany
World War II merchant ships of Germany